The Tonopah Public Library in Tonopah, Nevada was the third public library in Nevada.The one story stone building was designed by John J. Hill and was completed in 1906. The library was established by local residents Grace R. Moore and Marjorie Moore Brown to house a gift of 200 books from George F. Weeks.

Cornerstones to either side of the main facade read "Erected, 1906" and "John J. Hill, Builder", while the word "Library" is centered over the lintel of the front door. The library's collection was donated in memory of George Weeks' brother J.R., whose funeral was reputedly the first in Tonopah.

The library was placed on the National Register of Historic Places in 1982.

References

Library
Public libraries in Nevada
Library
Library buildings completed in 1906
Libraries on the National Register of Historic Places in Nevada
Library
1906 establishments in Nevada